The Soul Conductor is a 2018 Russian fantasy thriller film directed by Ilya Maksimov and starring Aleksandra Bortich, Yevgeny Tsyganov, Aleksandr Robak, Vyacheslav Razbegaev and Vladimir Yaglych.

The film was released in Russia on November 29, 2018 by 20th Century Fox CIS.

Plot
Katya has a mystical gift, she sees ghosts. When her twin sister disappears, the girl alone rushes in search. The police insist that the sister does not exist at all, that she is the fruit of Katya's sick imagination. However, during the search for her sister, Katya understands that a serial maniac is operating in town, and her sister is one of his victims. There is still hope to save her, but in a gloomy, mystery-filled city you cannot trust anyone, even yourself.

Cast
 Aleksandra Bortich as Katya Kaluzhskikh / Larisa Kaluzhskikh
 Martha Timofeeva as Katya, a little girl
 Yevgeny Tsyganov as Kapkov, the investigator
 Aleksandr Robak as Vasya, the ghost
 Vyacheslav Razbegaev as Pavel Laktin
 Vladimir Yaglych as Anton Morozov
 Ekaterina Rokotova as Bella, the ghost
 Vasily Bochkaryov as San Sanych
 Sergey Gorobchenko as Katya's dad
 Mariya Malinovskaya as Katya's mom
 Ekaterina Vulichenko as Alisa
 Anastasiya Mikhaylova as Alla
 Aleksandra Tulinova as Vera

Production

The Soul Conductor was shot almost completely without the use of special effects. Actors performed tricks without doubles. The interior of the main house of the Znamenskoye-Sadki manor was to be greatly changed: all the walls were completely repainted and set, the windows were boarded up, many interior items appeared, a whole corridor was created, which was then burned down during a fire scenario.

References

External links
 

2010s fantasy thriller films
2010s horror drama films
2018 psychological thriller films
2010s ghost films
Films about the afterlife
Films about twin sisters
Russian fantasy thriller films
Russian horror thriller films
Russian horror drama films
2018 thriller films